Nathaniel C. Britt II (born January 13, 1994) is an American former professional basketball player. He had a decorated college career at North Carolina where he won a national NCAA championship in 2017. Following this, Britt played five seasons of professional basketball in several countries.

Early life 
Britt is the son of Melody Britt and Nate Britt Sr, a police officer. He has a younger sister, Natalya. His friendship with Kris Jenkins, who went on to play for Villanova, began when they were 11 years old playing for the same AAU team coached by Britt's father. The Britts adopted Jenkins in 2007 into their Upper Marlboro, Maryland home. Britt was named Washington, D.C. player of the year in high school. He played for the USA under-18 national team, winning gold in the FIBA Americas under-18 Championships in Brazil in 2012.

College career 
Britt started his first ten games as a freshman at North Carolina. He had 10 points in an NCAA Tournament win over Arkansas. As a junior, Britt posted 5.4 points and 1.7 assists while only playing 15.4 minutes per game as a backup to Joel Berry II. He shot 38% from the field and 32% from behind the arc as the Tar Heels reached the NCAA Tournament final. As a senior, Britt averaged 4.5 points and 2.4 assists per game. The Tar Heels won the 2017 NCAA Tournament, defeating Gonzaga in the title game.

Professional career 
Britt played with the Atlanta Hawks in the NBA summer league. He was signed by the Westchester Knicks of the NBA G League on November 16, 2017. However, he was waived on November 28.

In December 2017, he signed with the Glasgow Rocks of the British Basketball League.

On July 24, 2018, Britt signed with Panionios in Greece. On September 24, 2018, he was replaced on the roster of the Greek team.

Britt signed with Boca Juniors in Argentina on December 5, 2018.

In August 2019, Britt signed with Omonia B.C. in Cyprus.

On May 28, 2020, Britt signed with the Wiha Panthers Schwenningen of Germany's ProA league. Britt joins the Panthers for the 2020–21 season after the 2019–20 season was abandoned due to the COVID-19 pandemic.

On July 22, 2021, Britt signed with Yoast United of the Dutch BNXT League.

Coaching career 
On July 22, Britt joined the coaching staff of the Stanford Cardinal as the new director of player development.

Personal 
Britt graduated from North Carolina with a degree in management and society.

Career statistics

Professional 

|-
| align=center | 2017–18
| align=left | Glasgow Rocks
| 25 || 24 || 28.5 || .378 || .268 || .815 || 3.7 || 3.6 || 1.8 || .3 || 11.7
|-
| align=center | 2018–19
| align=left | Boca Juniors
| 10 || 1 || 15.1 || .340 || .286 || .500 || 1.9 || 1.2 || .3 || .1 || 3.7
|-
| align=center | 2019–20
| align=left | Omonia Nicosia
| 21 || 20 || 33.7 || .382 || .254 || .775 || 4.1 || 3.6 || 1.8 || .1 || 14.5
|-
| align=center | 2020–21
| align=left | Wiha Panthers Schwenningen
| 31 || 29 || 30.0 || .419 || .359 || .808 || 3.7 || 5.4 || 2.2 || .3 || 13.6
|-
| align=center | 2021-22
| align=left | Yoast United
| 32 || 31 || 33.2 || .442 || .284 || .675 || 3.5 || 4.9 || 2.1 || .2 || 12.7
|-

College 

|-
| style="text-align:left;"| 2013–2014
| style="text-align:left;"| North Carolina
| 34 || 16 || 20.9 || .367 || .250 || .794 || 1.4 || 2.4 || 1.1 || .1 || 5.1
|-
| style="text-align:left;"| 2014–2015
| style="text-align:left;"| North Carolina
| 38 || 3 || 15.3 || .384 || .366 || .882 || 1.4 || 1.5 || .5 || .0 || 5.5
|-
| style="text-align:left;"| 2015–2016
| style="text-align:left;"| North Carolina
| 39 || 0 || 15.4 || .384 || .321 || .800 || 1.5 || 1.7 || .6 || .0 || 5.4
|-
| style="text-align:left;"| 2016–2017
| style="text-align:left;"| North Carolina
| 40 || 7 || 19.0 || .354 || .333 || .730 || 1.8 || 2.4 || 1.0 || .1 || 4.5
|-
| style="text-align:center;" colspan="2"|Career
| 151 || 26 || 17.6 || .372 || .335 || .812 || 1.5 || 2.0 || .8 || .0 || 5.1

References

External links 
North Carolina Tar Heels bio

1994 births
Living people
21st-century African-American sportspeople
African-American basketball players
American expatriate basketball people in Argentina
American expatriate basketball people in Cyprus
American expatriate basketball people in Greece
American expatriate basketball people in Germany
American expatriate basketball people in the Netherlands
American expatriate basketball people in the United Kingdom
American expatriate sportspeople in Scotland
American men's basketball players
Basketball players from Maryland
Boca Juniors basketball players
Glasgow Rocks players
Gonzaga College High School alumni
North Carolina Tar Heels men's basketball players
Oak Hill Academy (Mouth of Wilson, Virginia) alumni
Panthers Schwenningen players
People from Upper Marlboro, Maryland
Point guards
Sportspeople from the Washington metropolitan area
Westchester Knicks players
Yoast United players